The Savina Museum is a private contemporary art museum of South Korea, located in Anguk-dong, Jongno-gu, Seoul.

History
Savina Museum of Contemporary Art was established as Gallery Savina in 1996. In July 2002, Gallery Savina was renamed as Savina Museum of Contemporary Art.

The museum used to serve as an education center either. There are various educational programs implemented within the exhibition: «The Fun Encounter with Art, Math, and Science – Let’s Play, Logic!», «Discovering the Secret of Creativity Through Picasso and Magritte», «Career Searching for Youth Group».

The main purpose of this museum is being a role model to other private museums as an education center for citizens of Seoul.

Exhibitions

See also

List of museums in South Korea

References

External links
 

Jongno District
Art museums and galleries in Seoul
Art museums established in 1996
1996 establishments in South Korea